Yongho-dong may refer to any of three distinct administrative divisions of South Korea:

Yongho-dong, Busan, in Nam-gu
Yongho-dong, Changwon
Yongho-dong, Daejeon